Lynn M. Luker (born August 20, 1953) is an American politician who served in the Idaho House of Representatives from 2006 to 2018, representing District 15 in the A seat.

Early life, education, and career
Luker was born in Idaho Falls, Idaho and graduated from Lompoc High School. He earned his bachelor's degree in political science from University of California, Berkeley and Juris Doctor from University of Idaho College of Law.

Idaho House of Representatives
In 2004, Luker challenged 12-year incumbent Representative Max Black in the Republican primary, losing by 70 votes. Two years later, Representative Steve Smylie sought the Republican nomination for Superintendent of Public Instruction rather than seek reelection. Luker ran for the seat Smylie was vacating and won the Republican nomination in a three-way primary and the general election.

Committee assignments
 Judiciary, Rules and Administration Committee
 Local Government Committee
 State Affairs Committee

Luker previously served on the Health and Welfare Committee from 2006 to 2010, and as chairman of the Local Government Committee from 2014 to 2016.

Elections

References

External links
 Lynn M. Luker  at the Idaho Legislature
 

1953 births
Living people
Idaho lawyers
Republican Party members of the Idaho House of Representatives
People from Idaho Falls, Idaho
University of California, Berkeley alumni
University of Idaho alumni
People from Boise, Idaho
21st-century American politicians